The 1997 SCCA Pro Racing World Challenge season was the eighth running of the Sports Car Club of America's World Challenge series. The 1997 season is notable in that it began a thirteen-year era of the touring car class being contested primarily between BMW, Mazda, and Acura. This changed in 2010 with the adoption of an entirely new format. 1997 also saw the end of combined classes, with separate races for each group. This lasted until the 2010 season. After several years of having at least three groups, the series was reduced to only two, a format unseen since the series' inaugural season. This went  unchanged for thirteen years, after which the series changed to three and later four groups. After only mild success for three seasons, the Saturn brand got its final wins this season as another blow to General Motors in the series.

Results

References

GT World Challenge America